The 2015–16 South West Peninsula League season was the ninth in the history of the South West Peninsula League, a football competition in England, that feeds the Premier Division of the Western Football League. The league had been formed in 2007 from the merger of the Devon County League and the South Western League, and is restricted to clubs based in Cornwall and Devon. The Premier Division of the South West Peninsula League is on the same level of the National League System as the Western League Division One.

The constitution was announced on 15 May 2015. With regard to relegation from Division One East and Division One West, if only one club were eligible for promotion from these two divisions, then no club would be relegated, but if two clubs were eligible, then one club would be relegated and a playoff match would determine the relegated club. In the event, Okehampton Argyle accepted relegation without participating in a playoff.

Premier Division

The Premier Division featured 20 teams, the same as the previous season, after Bovey Tracey were relegated to Division One East, and Elmore resigned mid-season. Two new clubs joined the league:

Helston Athletic, promoted from Division One West.
Tavistock, promoted from Division One East.
No club applied for promotion to Step 5.

League table

Division One East
Division One East featured 18 clubs, the same as the previous season, after Tavistock were promoted to the Premier Division, Plymstock United were transferred to Division One West and two new clubs joined:

Bovey Tracey, relegated from the Premier Division.
Tiverton Town Reserves, promoted from the Devon and Exeter League.
Only Tiverton Town Reserves applied for promotion to the Premier Division, and the club passed the ground grading requirements.

Division One West
Division One West featured 17 clubs, increased from 16 the previous season, after Helston Athletic were promoted to the Premier Division, Perranporth resigned from the league and three new clubs joined:

Plymouth Argyle Reserves, applying from outside the pyramid system.
Plymstock United, transferred from Division One East.
Wendron United, promoted from the Cornwall Combination.
Liskeard Athletic, Plymouth Argyle Reserves, St Dennis and Sticker applied for promotion to the Premier Division. St Dennis failed the ground grading requirements, and the other clubs passed.

Promotion from feeder leagues for 2016–17
Clubs must achieve the necessary ground grading, and finish in the top three of their league. Only one club per league will be accepted. If two or more clubs satisfy all requirements and are considered of equal merit, the league board will decide on which club(s) to accept.

The following clubs have applied for promotion to Division One East and West for next season:
Cornwall Combination – Ludgvan (failed), Mullion (passed but rejected)
Devon & Exeter Football League – Elmore (passed but rejected), Feniton (passed but rejected), Newtown (passed but rejected), Topsham Town (failed)
North Devon Football League – Ilfracombe Town (passed but rejected), Torridgeside (passed and accepted)
Plymouth and West Devon Combination Football League – Plymouth Marjon (passed and accepted), Plymouth Sol (withdrawn)
South Devon Football League – Buckland Athletic Reserves (passed but rejected), Dartmouth (failed), Watcombe Wanderers (withdrawn)

References

External links
 South West Peninsula League

South West Peninsula League
10